John Herbert Hollick Todd (15 April 1881 – 14 May 1962) was an Australian rules footballer who played with Carlton in the Victorian Football League (VFL).

Notes 

 
Jack Todd's profile at Blueseum

1881 births
1962 deaths
Australian rules footballers from Victoria (Australia)		
Carlton Football Club players
People from North Melbourne